Poetry.com is a domain name that has historically been used for poetry-sharing in various forms.

History

Before March 7, 2009, the domain name Poetry.com was owned by New Catalyst Fund (NCF). The site was previously run by a Maryland-based company called The International Library of Poetry, also known as the International Society of Poets and the International Poetry Hall of Fame. Poetry.com claimed to coordinate monthly poetry contests and other services through its website, though the actual competitive nature of these contests was disputed. The site's ostensible primary purpose was publication of poetry anthologies submitted by aspiring authors and poetry conventions hosted by the group. The Better Business Bureau of Greater Maryland classified the business as a vanity publisher and noted that the quality of the poetry submitted to them "does not appear to be a significant consideration for selection for publication."

On March 7, 2009, Lulu.com purchased the Poetry.com domain from NCF. (Publish Today and Noble House Publishing, the branches of Poetry.com that managed the publishing and printing of their books, subsequently went out of business.) Lulu renamed the site Lulu Poetry. They targeted it to poets who wanted to connect with their peers, to seek reviews and feedback, and to receive recognition, contest prizes and publishing assistance.

In April 2011, Poetry.com was purchased by a New York-based group of private investors (Scott Tilson, Jeffrey Franz) from Lulu.com for undisclosed terms. The investors aimed to create an Internet-based creative social expression service, with the first acquisition being Poetry.com. In April 2012, Poetry.com was launched with 14 million archived poems, and reviews of poems were guaranteed in 60 minutes or less by the active community. By 2015, it had become a free-to-use site for amateur poets, where poets submitting to Poetry.com granted the site "royalty-free, perpetual, irrevocable, non-exclusive right (including any moral rights) and license to use, license, reproduce, modify, adapt, publish, translate, create derivative works from, distribute, derive revenue or other remuneration from, communicate to the public, perform and display the content (in whole or in part) worldwide and/or to incorporate it in other works in any form, media, or technology now known or later developed, for the full term of any Rights that may exist in such content."

In April 2018, Poetry.com went offline without explanation.

In January 2021, Poetry.com was brought back online after the domain was acquired by STANDS4.

Criticism 
Science Fiction and Fantasy Writers of America, Inc. (SFWA) have criticized the International Library of Poetry's business model, describing its practices as "deceptive and misleading" in that they misrepresented their activities as a contest based on the quality of poetry submitted, whereas in fact the quality had little or no influence on the outcome. It was also accused of describing the anthologies it published as a "real literary credit that poets can be proud of" while simultaneously producing anthologies that were available on special order only and which were full of poor quality poetry. When poets receive their purchased volumes they are given a discount to ILP's convention and are told they are "semi-finalists" for a grand prize. All conference attendees are semi-finalists. Semi-finalists for their poetry contest have also discovered their anthologies are different from other volumes sent to other semi-finalists, featuring the buyer's work near the front with work from other semi-finalists missing.

The Library of Congress lists Poetry.com as a vanity publisher. Poetry.com is not an accredited business with the Better Business Bureau, which has given the business an "F" rating. In 2004, the New York State Consumer Protection Board launched an investigation into ILP, which it said "takes advantage of people both emotionally and financially," but it suspended the investigation due to a shortage of complaints.

Other critics pointed out that standard industry practice was for winners of poetry contests to receive gratis copies of any publication of their work, and that ILP failed to follow this protocol. Also, Poetry.com did not always work correctly.

References

External links
 

Book publishing companies of the United States